Martha Nause (born September 10, 1954) is an American professional golfer. She is a three-time winner on the LPGA tour, including one major championship, the 1994 du Maurier Classic.

Nause was born in Sheboygan, Wisconsin. She attended St. Olaf College and her rookie year on the LPGA Tour was 1978.

Nause's other tour wins were the 1991 LPGA Chicago Sun-Times Shoot-Out and the 1988 Planters Pat Bradley International. She played on winning teams for the USA against Japan in the Nichirei Cup in 1988, 1991 and 1994. Her best money list finish was 19th in 1988. Her last full season on the tour was 1999 and she later became a college golf coach.

Nause also played on the Legends Tour. In 2006, she won the Hy-Vee Classic on the Legends Tour and was the tour's leading money earner. She played in the U.S. Women's Open in 2008 and 2010 and the inaugural U.S. Senior Women's Open in 2018.

Nause coached the Macalester College men's and women's golf teams from 2000 to 2012 and was named 2006-07 MIAC Women's Golf Coach of the Year after guiding the Scots to their best finish ever. She coached numerous All-Conference and NCAA Division III championship golfers, including four All-Americans.

She was the first woman inducted into the St. Olaf College Athletic Hall of Fame. Nause was also inducted into the Wisconsin Golf Hall of Fame in 1995.

Nause was a long-time student of golf instructor Manuel de la Torre.

Professional wins

LPGA Tour wins (3)

LPGA Tour playoff record (0–1)

Legends Tour wins (1)
2006 HyVee Classic

Major championships

Wins (1)

Team appearances
Professional
Handa Cup (representing the United States): 2006 (winners)

References

External links

American female golfers
LPGA Tour golfers
Winners of LPGA major golf championships
Golfers from Wisconsin
Sportspeople from Sheboygan, Wisconsin
College golf coaches in the United States
St. Olaf College alumni
1954 births
Living people
21st-century American women